Won't Go Back may refer to:
"Won't Go Back", a song from So Familiar (2015)
"Won't Go Back", a song from Lady in Gold (album) (2016)